This article concerns the period 759 BC – 750 BC.

Events and trends
 756 BCE—Founding of Cyzicus.
 755 BC—Ashur-nirari V succeeds Ashur-Dan III as king of Assyria
 755 BC—Aeschylus, King of Athens, dies after a reign of 23 years and is succeeded by Alcmaeon.
 753 BC—Alcmaeon, King of Athens, dies after a reign of 2 years. He is replaced by Charops, elected Archon for a ten-year term.

 753 BC—The city of Rome and the Roman Kingdom were thought to be founded, according to Roman tradition, and is ruled by Rome's first king, Romulus. Beginning of the Roman 'Ab urbe condita' calendar. Rome adopts the Etruscan alphabet, which the Etruscans themselves had adopted from the Greeks. Set by Varro, this was the most common date used.
 752 BC—Romulus, first king of Rome, celebrates the first Roman triumph after his victory over the Caeninenses, following the Rape of the Sabine Women.  He celebrates a further triumph later in the year over the Antemnates.
 c. 750 BC—Man and Centaur, perhaps from Olympia, is made. It is now at the Metropolitan Museum of Art, New York.
 c. 750 BC—Greeks establish colonies in Italy and Sicily.
 c. 750 BC – 700 BC—Funerary Vase (Krater), from the Dipylon Cemetery, Athens, is made. Attributed to the Hirschfield workshop. It is now at The Metropolitan Museum of Art, New York.

Significant people
 Shoshenq V, Pharaoh of the Twenty-second dynasty of Egypt (767–730 BC)
 Osorkon III, Pharaoh of the Twenty-third dynasty of Egypt (787–759 BC)
 Takelot III, Pharaoh of the Twenty-third dynasty of Egypt (764–757 BC)
 Rudamun, Pharaoh of the Twenty-third dynasty of Egypt (757–754 BC)
 Ini, Pharaoh of the Twenty-third dynasty of Egypt (754–715 BC)
 Niumateped, chief of the Libu (775–750 BC)
 Titaru, chief of the Libu (758–750 BC)
 Ker, chief of the Libu (750–745 BC)
 Manava, author of the Indian geometric text of Sulba Sutras. (b. 750 BC)
 Uzziah, King of Judah (791-740 BC)
 759 BC—Alexander king of Corinth killed by his successor Telestes.
 757 BC—Birth of Duke Zhuang of Zheng

References